Shaadi Impossible ( Marriage Impossible) is a 2019 Pakistani romantic comedy television film aired on TVOne Pakistan on 5 June 2019. It stars Yumna Zaidi, Affan Waheed, Saman Ansari and Noman Masood in pivot roles.

Synopsis
It is the story of girl Raina (Yumna). Her mother died when she was young and she is raised by her single father and paternal grand-mother. Raina refuses to marry after completing her studies, as a result of pressure from her family, she keeps some not so easy conditions for the marriage. The family arranged her appointment with Zaid, a well settled guy, whose mother is divorced. Whilst the families are happy with their relationship , Rania and Zaid decide to fake their relationship .  After a series of consequences, it appears that marriage is fixed among their single parents Kabir and Mehar and not their kids.

Cast 
 Yumna Zaidi as Raina
 Affan Waheed as Zaid
 Saman Ansari as Meher; Zaid's mother
 Noman Masood as Kabir; Raima's father
 Ismat Zaidi as Bebo; Raima's grand-mother
 Benazir Khan as Ajiya; Zaid's cousin
 Aliya Jamshed as Zaid's aunt & Ajiya's mother

References 

2019 comedy films
2019 films
Pakistani television films
2010s Urdu-language films